Devi Singh Bhati is an ex-member of the 7th-13th Houses of the Rajasthan Legislative Assembly from Kolayat in Rajasthan state in India. He was a cabinet minister in the government.

References

Rajasthani people
Living people
Members of the Rajasthan Legislative Assembly
1946 births
People from Bikaner district
Bharatiya Janata Party politicians from Rajasthan
Janata Party politicians
Janata Dal politicians